Milak Assembly constituency is one of the 403 constituencies of the Uttar Pradesh Legislative Assembly, India. It is a part of the Rampur district and one of the five assembly constituencies in the Rampur Lok Sabha constituency. First election in this assembly constituency was held in 2012 after the "Delimitation of Parliamentary and Assembly Constituencies Order, 2008" was passed in the year 2008. The constituency is assigned identification number 38.

Wards / Areas
Extent of Milak Assembly constituency is Shahabad Tehsil; PCs Ramnagar, Dhamora, Puraina, Ainchora, Larhpur, Lohapatti Bholanath, Bhainsori, Jalif Nagla, Vikrampur, Khutia, Dhanelipurbi, Param, Kripyapanday, Purainya Kalan of Milak KC & Milak MB of Milak Tehsil.

Members of the Legislative Assembly

Election Results

2022

2017

16th Vidhan Sabha: 2012 General Elections.

See also
Rampur district
Rampur Lok Sabha constituency
Sixteenth Legislative Assembly of Uttar Pradesh
Uttar Pradesh Legislative Assembly

References

External links
 

Assembly constituencies of Uttar Pradesh
Rampur district
Constituencies established in 2008
2008 establishments in Uttar Pradesh